Daland is a city in the Central District of Ramian County in Golestan Province, in northern Iran.  At the 2006 census, its population was 7,732, in 1,981 families.

References

Populated places in Ramian County

Cities in Golestan Province